Q (formerly QTV, standing for Quality TeleVision) was a television network in the Philippines run by GMA Network Inc. through Citynet Network Marketing and Productions, Inc. The network primarily aired lifestyle programs and dramas particularly aimed toward women. Its flagship station was DZOE-TV, which GMA ran as part of a lease with its owner, ZOE Broadcasting Network (who also aired programming on Q's schedule as part of the agreement, which also granted it access to technical resources from GMA).

On February 20, 2011, Q was discontinued in preparation for the launch of a new secondary network, GMA News TV.

History
Q launched on November 11, 2005 as QTV, standing for "Quality Television". Its flagship stations in Metro Manila were DZOE-TVwhich GMA leased as part of a partnership with the religious broadcaster ZOE Broadcasting Network (gaining control of the station in exchange for providing equipment for ZOE, and allowing airtime for ZOE-produced programming on QTV), with the GMA-owned DWDB-TV serving as a UHF translator (GMA had previously operated as the independent station Citynet 27, before it went silent in the middle of 2001). The new network would feature a lineup predominantly aimed towards women, with a mixture of domestic and imported lifestyle programs and dramatic series. On March 18, 2007, QTV introduced a new logo, branding the network simply as "Q".

Relaunch as GMA News TV
On February 7, 2011, GMA Network announced that it would replace Q with the news channel GMA News TV (now GTV). As Q's programming ended on February 20; the network, broadcasting under transitional branding Channel 11, continued to air teasers for the impending re-launch from February 21–25, and signed off completely on the 26th and 27th of the same month in preparation for its formal re-launch as GMA News TV on February 28.

Final Programming 

Some of Q's programming consists of Filipino and English-language programming, and additional programming produced by GMA.

See also 
List of Philippine television networks
ZOE Broadcasting Network
A2Z
GMA Network
GTV

References

External links 
 
Q @ Telebisyon.net 

 
Defunct television networks in the Philippines
Television channels and stations established in 2005
Television channels and stations disestablished in 2011
Women's interest channels
2005 establishments in the Philippines
2011 disestablishments in the Philippines
GMA Network (company) channels
ZOE Broadcasting Network